CJLS may refer to:

 The Committee on Jewish Law and Standards of the Conservative Movement of Judaism
 CJLS-FM, a radio station based in Yarmouth, Nova Scotia, Canada
 Columbus Japanese Language School